Gace Słupieckie is a village in the administrative district of Gmina Łubnice, within Staszów County, Świętokrzyskie Voivodeship, in south-central Poland.

The village has a population of 215.

Demography 
According to the 2002 Poland census, there were 223 people residing in Gace Słupieckie village, of whom 49.8% were male and 50.2% were female. In the village, the population was spread out, with 20.6% under the age of 18, 33.6% from 18 to 44, 18.4% from 45 to 64, and 27.4% who were 65 years of age or older.
 Figure 1. Population pyramid of village in 2002 – by age group and sex

References

Villages in Staszów County